Mimostedes is a genus of longhorn beetles of the subfamily Lamiinae, containing the following species:

subgenus Birmanostedes
 Mimostedes birmanus Breuning, 1958

subgenus Mimostedes
 Mimostedes basilewskyi Breuning, 1955
 Mimostedes decellei Breuning, 1968
 Mimostedes fuscosignatus Breuning, 1956
 Mimostedes fuscus Breuning, 1967
 Mimostedes mirei Breuning, 1977
 Mimostedes sudanicus Breuning, 1955
 Mimostedes trivittipennis Breuning, 1956
 Mimostedes ugandicola Breuning, 1955
 Mimostedes vagemaculatus Breuning, 1970

subgenus Nairobostedes
 Mimostedes meneghettii Breuning, 1958

subgenus Punjabostedes
 Mimostedes kashmirensis Breuning, 1957
 Mimostedes punjabensis Breuning, 1957

References

Desmiphorini